Prestwick South Parish Church is located in South Prestwick, South Ayrshire, Scotland. It is a Parish Church in the Church of Scotland and within the Presbytery of Ayr.  It is a category B listed building.

Ministers
There have been several ministers at Prestwick South.

Rev. Kenneth C. Elliott (1989–present)
Rev. Thomas Barr Girwood (1981 - 1988)
Rev. Jack Brown – (1976 – 1980)
Rev. James Burgoyne Yorke - (1947 – 1976)
Rev. George Adam Theodore Napier Christie – (1935 – 1947)
Rev. Alexander Gibson – (1912 – 1934)
Rev. Robert Alexander Cameron MacMillan – (1909 – 1910)
Rev. Ernest Finlay Scott – (1895 – 1908)
Rev. Archibald Alison - (1882-1900)

References

Category B listed buildings in South Ayrshire
Churches in South Ayrshire
Church of Scotland churches in Scotland